James Sanford Davenport (September 21, 1864 – January 3, 1940) was a U.S. Representative from Oklahoma and a member of the Oklahoma Court of Criminal Appeals. He served on the Congressional committee that created the first roads and highways committee in the U.S. House.

Early life and career
Born on a farm near Gaylesville, Alabama, Davenport moved with his parents to Conway, Arkansas, in 1880. He attended the common schools, Vilona (Arkansas) High School, and Greenbrier (Arkansas) Academy. He studied law.

He was admitted to the bar of Faulkner County on February 14, 1890, and commenced practice in Conway. In October of that year, Davenport  moved to Muskogee, Indian Territory (now Oklahoma), and in 1893 to Vinita, where he engaged in the practice of law.

Political career 
He served as member of the Territorial council 1897-1901, serving as speaker the last two years of his term. He was one of the attorneys for the Cherokee Nation from 1901-1907. He served as mayor of Vinita in 1903 and 1904.

Davenport was elected as a Democrat to the 60th Congress on September 17, 1907, and served from November 16, 1907, when Oklahoma was admitted as a State into the Union, until March 3, 1909. He was an unsuccessful candidate for reelection in 1908 to the 61st Congress.

Davenport was elected to the 62nd, 63rd, and 64th Congresses (March 4, 1911 – March 3, 1917). He was an unsuccessful candidate for reelection in 1916 to the 65th Congress. He resumed the practice of law in Vinita. He was elected judge of the Oklahoma Court of Criminal Appeals in November 1926.

Death 
He was reelected in 1932 and served until his death in Oklahoma City, Oklahoma, January 3, 1940. He was interred in Fairview Cemetery, Vinita, Oklahoma.

References

External links 
 Encyclopedia of Oklahoma History and Culture - Davenport, James
 

1864 births
1940 deaths
People from Cherokee County, Alabama
Democratic Party members of the United States House of Representatives from Oklahoma
Members of the Oklahoma Territorial Legislature
People from Vinita, Oklahoma
Oklahoma state court judges
Oklahoma lawyers